Olaf Peters (born 14 July 1964) is a German weightlifter. He competed in the men's heavyweight II event at the 1984 Summer Olympics.

References

1964 births
Living people
German male weightlifters
Olympic weightlifters of West Germany
Weightlifters at the 1984 Summer Olympics
Sportspeople from Hamburg
20th-century German people